Colinton is a suburb of Edinburgh, Scotland situated  south-west of the city centre. Up until the late 18th century it appears on maps as Collington. It is bordered by Dreghorn to the south and Craiglockhart to the north-east. To the north-west it extends to Lanark Road (the A70) and to the south-west to the City Bypass. Bonaly is a subsection of the area on its southern side.

Colinton is a designated conservation area.

History

Originally sited within a steep-sided glen on a convenient fording point on the Water of Leith, and expanding from there, Colinton's history dates back to before the 11th century.

Close to the Water of Leith is Colinton Parish Church, correctly called St Cuthbert's Parish Church, which was founded as the Church of Halis (Hailes) around 1095 by Elthelred, third son of Malcolm III and Queen Margaret. The current exterior largely dates from 1907 but the structure dates from 1650. The entrance is marked by a lych gate, rare in Scotland and more common in southern England. The cemetery (on the lower slopes to the south) contains the village war memorial. One unique grave within the cemetery is a Norwegian War Grave.

In May 1599 an English adventurer Edmund Ashfield came to Colinton and met James VI, and in September another English visitor Henry Lee with David Foulis watched James VI hunting from the tower of the castle, then he stopped there for a meal.

The village was occupied by ten companies of General Monk's Regiment (now known as the Coldstream Guards) on 18 August 1650 prior to their attack on Colinton Castle and Redhall  during the English Civil War.

The nearby 15th century Colinton Castle, in the grounds of what is now Merchiston Castle School, was destroyed by Oliver Cromwell during his invasion of Scotland. Following repair, the castle was subsequently partially demolished by the artist Alexander Nasmyth in order to create a picturesque ruin.

Other notable figures with connections to Colinton include: Robert Louis Stevenson who spent the summers of his childhood at the manse when his grandfather was the village's Parish Minister; the philanthropist James Gillespie; and architects Sir Robert Rowand Anderson and John James Burnet, who all lived in the village.

A number of innovative Arts and Crafts style cottages were also constructed in the village in the early 1900s by the architect Sir Robert Lorimer. Between 1909 and 1915, the War Office constructed Redford Barracks to the east of the village. The barracks represent the largest military installation built in Scotland since Fort George in the Highlands and they provide military accommodation, together with offices and training facilities.  As part of the UK government's defence spending review, Redford and Dreghorn Barracks are deemed surplus to requirements and earmarked for disposal.

The village was the location for mills producing textiles, snuff, and paper. The Caledonian Railway Company constructed a spur line connecting Slateford and Balerno in 1874, with a station at Colinton. This line continued to carry passengers until 1943, but closed altogether when the carriage of freight was discontinued in 1967.

Colinton Parish was amalgamated into Edinburgh on 1 November 1920. As of 2007, it forms a core part of the Colinton/Fairmilehead multi-member ward for the City of Edinburgh Council.

Colinton today

Although now a well-established suburb of Edinburgh, the original heart of Colinton is still referred to as "Colinton Village", with small speciality shops and many original buildings remaining intact.

The Dell extends along the Water of Leith Walkway from Colinton Parish Church towards Slateford, and contains a mixture of mature and ancient woodland. It is a natural habitat for wildlife. The walkway and cycle path pass by original mill buildings and an old tunnel that dates back to when the path was part of the local railway line. Spylaw Park is situated  within the area.

Colinton is served by Colinton Primary School, Bonaly Primary School, Firrhill High School. Merchiston Castle School, east of the village, is an independent all-boys boarding school.

The major route to the city centre, Colinton Road, runs from Colinton through Craiglockhart to Holy Corner, a part of Burghmuirhead between Morningside and Bruntsfield. Along the road are a number of significant Victorian and Edwardian villas, some of which were designed by Edward Calvert.

Publications 
In addition to city-wide media, Colinton is covered by Colinton Magazine, published by the Colinton Amenity Association. The magazine includes reports from CAA officers and articles of general interest about Colinton and neighbouring Bonaly.

Since 2014, Colinton has also been included within the distribution area of C&B News (originally Currie & Balerno News), a volunteer-led community news magazine covering Colinton as well as nearby Juniper Green, Baberton Mains, Currie, and Balerno. Launched in February 1976, and published 10 times a year, the publication features local news and articles, reports from local groups/organisations, political representatives and Community Councils, plus regular coverage of local planning applications and developments.

Ethnicity

Transport
See also Transport in Edinburgh
The following bus routes, operated by Lothian Buses pass through Colinton village, and the surrounding roads:

 Number 10 Bus — Western Harbour (through city via Princes Street) to Bonaly
 Number 16 Bus — Silverknowes (through city via Princes Street) to Torphin
 Number 400 Bus — Fort Kinnaird (through suburbs) to Edinburgh Airport
 Number 45 Bus — Heriot-Watt University Riccarton Campus to Queen Margaret University Musselburgh Campus via South and North bridges

Famous residents

 Archibald Alison – Scottish didactic and philosophical writer
 John Allen – eighteenth and nineteenth century political and historical writer
 Henry Mackenzie – Scottish novelist (note- the tiny cottage known as "Henry Mackenzie's cottage" seems unlikely for his social standing, and his only link to this area is during is apprenticeship as a lawyer, to George Inglis of Redhall House, when aged 14, however, as an apprentice his link would have been to Inglis' office in Edinburgh, not his house in Redhall)
 Lord Cockburn – Scottish judge and biographer
 John MacWhirter – Scottish landscape painter.
 Calum Elliot – Professional footballer
 David Foulis of Colinton – landowner and diplomat
 Thomas Foulis – goldsmith and financier
 James Gillespie – merchant and philanthropist 
 Fred Goodwin – former CEO of Royal Bank of Scotland, bought former house of Graeme Souness
 Mo Johnston – Professional footballer and manager
 Loudon MacQueen Douglas FRSE – antiquarian and author
 Margaret Hope MacPherson – crofter, politician, and activist; born here
 Craig Gordon – Professional Footballer 
 Craig Reid of The Proclaimers 
 Stuart "Woody" Wood of The Bay City Rollers
 John Byrne – Artist and Playwright (The Slab Boys)
 Ramsay Heatley Traquair his wife Phoebe Traquair and son Harry Moss Traquair

See also
These areas are sometimes taken to be parts of Colinton, or to be neighbouring areas in their own right:
 Bonaly
 Dreghorn
 Redford
 Torphin
 Woodfield
 Woodhall

References

External links

 Colinton on the Gazetteer for Scotland
 Colinton Parish Church Website
 Firhill High School Website
 Merchiston Castle School Website
 Water of Leith Website

Areas of Edinburgh
Villages in Edinburgh council area
Parishes formerly in Midlothian